Gomal District is a district of Paktika Province, Afghanistan. The estimated population in 2019 was 45,873. The district is within the heartland of the Kharoti tribe of Ghilji Pashtuns.

It is named after the Gomal River.

References

Districts of Paktika Province